José Andrés Monroy Saldaña (born 10 March 1996) is a Mexican footballer who plays as a defender for Club Atlas.

References

External links
 

1996 births
Living people
Mexican footballers
Association football defenders
Footballers from Guadalajara, Jalisco
Atlas F.C. footballers